Frankie Laine was Frankie Laine's first Mercury Records 10" long-play album, recorded in 1949 and originally planned for release in 1950. However, it came out sooner in 1949, and they were able to include the Frankie Laine hit, "Cry of the Wild Goose."

Track listing

References
 The Frankie Laine Discography

Frankie Laine albums
1949 debut albums
Mercury Records albums